Ricardo Izecson dos Santos Leite (born 22 April 1982), commonly known as Kaká or Ricardo Kaká, is a Brazilian former professional footballer who played as an attacking midfielder. In his prime as a playmaker at AC Milan, a period marked by his creative passing, goal scoring and dribbles from midfield, Kaká is widely considered one of the best players of his generation. With success at club and international level, he is one of nine players to have won the FIFA World Cup, the UEFA Champions League and the Ballon d'Or.

Kaká made his professional club debut at age 18 at São Paulo in Brazil in 2001, and his performances with the club led to him joining Serie A club AC Milan in 2003. In Italy, Kaká helped Milan win the Serie A title in his first season. Milan finished runners up in the 2004–05 UEFA Champions League with Kaká the top assist provider of the tournament, and he was named the UEFA Club Midfielder of the Year. He led Milan to win the 2006–07 UEFA Champions League and was the tournament's top goal scorer. His performances saw him win the FIFA World Player of the Year, the 2007 Ballon d'Or and the UEFA Club Footballer of the Year. After six years with Milan, Kaká joined Real Madrid in 2009 for a transfer fee of €67 million, which was the second highest transfer fee at the time. However, after four injury troubled seasons in Spain, which saw his physical mobility rapidly decline, he returned to AC Milan for a single season in 2013, prior to joining MLS expansion club Orlando City. He initially returned to his former club São Paulo on loan, before returning to Orlando in 2015 and retiring in 2017.

Kaká made his debut for the Brazil national team in 2002, and was selected for their victorious FIFA World Cup squad that year. An established member of the team for the 2006 World Cup, he was part of a much vaunted quartet that included Ronaldo, Adriano and Ronaldinho that ultimately underperformed at the tournament before he made his final appearance in a World Cup in 2010. He was also a member of Brazil's 2005 and 2009 FIFA Confederations Cup-winning squads, winning the Golden Ball Award in 2009 as the tournament's best player.

In addition to his individual awards, between 2006 and 2009 he was named in both the FIFA World XI and the UEFA Team of the Year three times. In 2010, he was named in the AC Milan Hall of Fame. One of the world's most famous athletes during his playing career, Kaká was the first sportsperson to amass 10 million followers on Twitter. Off the field, Kaká is known for his humanitarian work, where he became the youngest ambassador of the UN World Food Programme in 2004. For his contributions on and off the pitch, Kaká was listed by Time as one of the world's 100 most influential people in 2008 and 2009.

Early life
Ricardo Izecson dos Santos Leite was born in Gama, Federal District, to Simone dos Santos, an elementary school teacher, and Bosco Izecson Pereira Leite, a civil engineer. He had a financially secure upbringing that allowed him to focus on both school and football at the same time. His younger brother Rodrigo (best known as Digão) and cousin Eduardo Delani are also professional footballers. Digão called him "Caca" due to his inability to pronounce "Ricardo" when they were young; it eventually evolved into Kaká. The word has no specific Portuguese translation.

When he was seven, Kaká's family moved to São Paulo, in the homonymous state. His school had arranged him in a local youth club called "Alphaville," who qualified to the final in a local tournament. There he was discovered by hometown club São Paulo FC, who offered him a place in the youth academy. At the age of 18, Kaká suffered a career-threatening and possibly paralysis-inducing spinal fracture as a result of a swimming pool accident, but made a full recovery. He attributes his recovery to God and has since tithed his income to his church.

Club career

São Paulo

Kaká began his career with São Paulo at the age of eight. He signed a contract at 15 and led the São Paulo youth squad to Copa de Juvenil glory. He made his senior side debut on 1 February 2001 and scored 12 goals in 27 appearances, in addition to leading São Paulo to its first and only Torneio Rio-São Paulo championship, in which he scored two goals in two minutes as a substitute against Botafogo in the final, which São Paulo won 2–1.

He scored ten goals in 22 matches the following season, and by this time his performance was soon attracting attention from European clubs. Kaká made a total of 58 appearances for São Paulo, scoring 23 times.

AC Milan

The steady European interest in Kaká culminated in his signing with the European champions, Italian club AC Milan, in 2003 for a fee of reported €8.5 million, described in retrospect as "peanuts" by club owner Silvio Berlusconi. Within a month, he cracked the starting lineup, replacing Rui Costa in the attacking midfield playmaking position, behind strikers Jon Dahl Tomasson, Filippo Inzaghi and Andriy Shevchenko. His Serie A debut was in a 2–0 win over Ancona. He scored ten goals in 30 appearances that season, also providing several important assists, such as the cross which led to Shevchenko's title-deciding headed goal, as Milan won the Scudetto and the UEFA Super Cup, whilst finishing as runner up in the Intercontinental Cup and the 2003 Supercoppa Italiana. Milan also reached the semi-finals of the Coppa Italia, losing out to eventual winners Lazio, and were knocked out of the quarter-finals of the Champions League by Deportivo La Coruña. Due to his performances in his debut season, in 2004, Kaká was named Serie A Footballer of the Year, and was nominated for both the Ballon d'Or (finishing 15th) and the 2004 FIFA World Player of the Year (finishing 10th).

Kaká was a part of the five-man midfield in the 2004–05 season, usually playing in a withdrawn role behind striker Andriy Shevchenko. He was supported by Gennaro Gattuso and Clarence Seedorf defensively, as well as Massimo Ambrosini, allowing Kaká as the attacking midfielder and Rui Costa or Andrea Pirlo as the deep-lying playmaker to be in charge of creating Milan's goalscoring chances, forming a formidable midfield unit in both Italy and Europe. Milan began the season by winning the Supercoppa Italiana against Lazio. He scored seven goals in 36 domestic appearances as Milan finished runner-up in the Scudetto race. Milan also reached the quarter-finals of the Coppa Italia that season. Kaká played a pivotal role in Milan's Champions League campaign that season, helping them to reach the final against Liverpool, scoring two goals and providing five assists. Dubbed the "Miracle of Istanbul", Milan led 3–0 at half time, before Liverpool staged a comeback, scoring three goals in six minutes, and eventually won the match 3–2 on penalties. A match widely regarded as one of the greatest finals in the competition's history, Kaká was imperious in the first half; he first won the early free-kick which led to Paolo Maldini's opening goal, began the play that led to Hernán Crespo's first goal and Milan's second of the night, then executed a long curling pass that split open the Liverpool defence and rolled directly into the path of Crespo to score Milan's third. Kaká was once again nominated for the Ballon d'Or and FIFA World Player of the Year Awards, finishing ninth and eighth respectively, and he was named the 2005 UEFA Club Football Best Midfielder.

The 2005–06 season saw Kaká score his first hat-tricks in domestic competitions. On 9 April 2006, he scored his first Rossoneri hat-trick against Chievo, with all three goals scored in the second half. Milan were knocked out in the semi-finals of the 2005–06 Champions League to eventual champions Barcelona, and were once again eliminated in the quarter-finals of the Coppa Italia. Milan also finished once again as runners-up in Serie A, with Kaká scoring 17 goals in the league. After the 2006 Calciopoli scandal, however, Milan were deducted 30 points, which placed them in third in the table. Kaká was nominated for the Ballon d'Or and the FIFA World Player of the Year Awards for the third consecutive year, finishing 11th and seventh respectively. He was also selected to be part of both the UEFA Team of the Year and the FIFPro World XI for the first time in his career.

Andriy Shevchenko's departure to Chelsea for the 2006–07 season allowed Kaká to become the focal point of Milan's offense as he alternated between the midfield and forward positions, operating at times as a striker or as a second striker behind Filippo Inzaghi, as well as in his more typical attacking midfield position. On 2 November 2006, he scored his first Champions League hat-trick in a 4–1 group stage win over the Belgian side Anderlecht. He finished as the top scorer in the 2006–07 Champions League campaign with ten goals. One of the goals helped the Rossoneri eliminate Celtic in the round of 16, 1–0 on aggregate, and he scored three goals against Manchester United in the semi-finals. Milan also reached the semi-finals of the Coppa Italia that season, losing out to winners Roma, and finished fourth in Serie A.

Kaká won the Champions League title when Milan defeated Liverpool 2–1 on 23 May 2007, avenging the previous loss on penalties two years before. Though he went scoreless, he won a free kick that led to the first of Filippo Inzaghi's two goals, and provided the assist for the second. On 30 August, Kaká was named by UEFA as both the top forward of the 2006–07 Champions League season and UEFA Club Footballer of the Year, as well as being named as part of the UEFA Team of the Year for the second time. He once again finished as the second-best assist-provider of the Champions League, providing five, and was voted the 2007 IFFHS World's Best Playmaker.

Milan began its 2007–08 season by winning the UEFA Super Cup on 31 August, defeating Sevilla 3–1, with Kaká scoring the third goal. Kaká had made a dribbling run into Sevilla's area, winning a penalty, which he then proceeded to take. Although it was saved by goalkeeper Andrés Palop, Kaká scored on the rebound with a header. Kaká had previously hit the post in the first half. He played his 200th career match with Milan in a 1–1 home draw with Catania on 30 September, scoring from a penalty, and on 5 October, he was named the 2006–07 FIFPro World Player of the Year, and was elected as part of the FIFPro World XI for the second time in his career. On 2 December 2007, Kaká became the eighth Milan player to win the Ballon d'Or, as he finished with a decisive 444 votes, well ahead of Cristiano Ronaldo and Lionel Messi. He signed a contract extension through 2013 with Milan on 29 February 2008.

On 16 December, Kaká won the FIFA Club World Cup against Boca Juniors, scoring Milan's third goal of the match in a 4–2 victory which allowed them to be crowned World Champions. Kaká had previously assisted Filippo Inzaghi's opening goal of the match and also assisted Inzaghi's final goal of the match after an impressive exchange with Clarence Seedorf; he was awarded the Golden Ball as the best player of the competition. On 17 December, Kaká was voted the 2007 FIFA World Player of the Year with 1,047 votes, ahead of Lionel Messi with 504 and Cristiano Ronaldo with 426.

In January 2008, Kaká was also named the 2007 Serie A Footballer of the Year, winning the award for the second time in his career. His contributions on and off the pitch saw Time magazine name Kaká in the Time 100 list on 2 May. On 14 October, he cast his footprints into the Estádio do Maracanã's sidewalk of fame, in a section dedicated to the memory of the country's top players. Kaká finished the 2007–08 season with 15 goals in Serie A. His best goals included a curling strike from 30 yards into the top corner against Lazio, a powerful strike from the edge of the 18-yard box against Cagliari, and a now trademark slalom run past a number of Udinese players before bending the ball into the bottom corner. He was nominated as a finalist for the 2008 FIFA World Player of the Year, finishing fourth, and was nominated for the Ballon d'Or, finishing in eighth. He was named in the six-man shortlist for the 2008 Laureus World Sportsman of the Year, and was selected in the FIFPro World XI for the third time in his career. He was named in the Time 100 again in 2009.

The BBC reported on 13 January 2009 that Manchester City made a bid for Kaká for over £100 million. Milan Director Umberto Gandini replied that Milan would only discuss the matter if Kaká and Manchester City agreed to personal terms. Kaká initially responded by telling reporters he wanted to "grow old" at Milan and dreamed of captaining the club one day, but later said, "If Milan want to sell me, I'll sit down and talk. I can say that as long as the club don't want to sell me, I'll definitely stay." On 19 January, Silvio Berlusconi announced that Manchester City had officially ended their bid after a discussion between the clubs, and that Kaká would remain with Milan. Milan supporters had protested outside the club headquarters earlier that evening, and later chanted outside Kaká's home, where he saluted them by flashing his jersey outside a window. Kaká finished his final season with Milan by scoring 16 goals, helping Milan finish third in Serie A, and once again being elected as a finalist for the FIFA World Player of the Year Award, finishing fourth in voting for the second-straight year. He was also nominated for the Ballon d'Or award, finishing in sixth place, and was named in the UEFA Team of the Year for the third time in his career.

Real Madrid

On 3 June 2009, it was reported that newly elected Real Madrid president Florentino Pérez had offered to buy Kaká from Milan for a reported €68.5 million, two days after the player had left for international duty with Brazil. Milan vice-chairman and CEO Adriano Galliani confirmed that he and Kaká's father, Bosco Leite, had traveled to Mexico to meet with La Volpe: "We had lunch and spoke about Kaká. I don't deny it. Negotiations exist, but a deal has yet to be done." On 4 June, Galliani told Gazzetta dello Sport that financial reasons were his motive for the talks with La Volpe: "We cannot allow [Milan] to lose €70 million ... The reasons behind Kaká's departure would be economic." On 8 June, Milan and Real Madrid confirmed Kaká's move to the Santiago Bernabéu Stadium on a six-year deal for €67 million fee.

Kaká was unveiled as a Real Madrid player on 30 June 2009, and he made his unofficial debut on 7 August 2009 in a 5–1 friendly victory against Toronto FC. He scored his first goal for Madrid during a pre-season match on 19 August 2009, in a 5–0 victory against Borussia Dortmund. Kaká later made his league debut on 29 August 2009 in a 3–2 win against Deportivo de La Coruña. He scored his first goal, a penalty, on 23 September in a 2–0 win against Villarreal. Real Madrid finished the season as runners-up in La Liga, with Kaká scoring eight goals and providing six assists in La Liga, and nine goals and eight assists in all competitions.

On 5 August 2010, Real Madrid announced that Kaká had undergone a successful surgery on a long-standing left knee injury and would face up to four months on the sidelines. Kaká returned to training after a long lay-off, with manager José Mourinho commenting that having Kaká back from injury was like a new signing. After an eight-month absence, Kaká returned to play by entering as a substitute for Karim Benzema on the 77th minute of a 3–2 victory over Getafe on 3 January 2011. He said he was "(...) happy for playing a game again and for stepping onto a pitch." His first league goal (and his first of the season) after his return from injury came with an assist from Cristiano Ronaldo on a 4–2 victory over Villarreal on 9 January 2011.

In March 2011, Kaká suffered from Iliotibial band syndrome, which kept him sidelined for a few weeks. After returning from injury, he appeared in a convincing win over Valencia, scoring two goals. At the end of his second season with the club, Real Madrid and Kaká had won the Copa del Rey, although they finished as runners-up in both La Liga and in the Supercopa de España to rivals Barcelona. Real Madrid were also knocked out of the Champions League by Barcelona in the semi-finals of the competition. Kaká finished his season with seven goals and six assists in all competitions in 20 appearances.

On 27 September 2011, Kaká experienced one of his best matches as a Real Madrid player during a 3–0 victory over Ajax in the Champions League, as he scored one goal, provided one assist and participated in one of the best team build-ups of the matchday: a counterattacking move involving Mesut Özil, Cristiano Ronaldo and Karim Benzema. Kaká was later chosen the best player of the Champions League Matchday. With this match, Kaká experienced one of the best starts to a season he has ever had, scoring two goals, serving two assists and winning one penalty for his team. In 2011–12, Real Madrid won La Liga with a record 100 points that year, with Kaká providing nine assists and scoring five goals in the competition. They were, however, eliminated for the second year in a row in the semi-finals of the Champions League, losing out to eventual runners-up Bayern Munich on penalties. The decisive misses for Real Madrid were by Ronaldo, Kaká and Sergio Ramos. He finished the season with eight goals and 14 assists in all club competitions. Real Madrid were eliminated in the quarter-finals of the Copa del Rey by eventual winners Barcelona.

Real Madrid began the 2012–13 season by winning the 2012 Supercopa de España against rivals Barça. On 4 December 2012, after scoring in a 4–1 win against Ajax, Kaká became the top Brazilian goalscorer in Champions League history, with 28 goals. After the match, Kaká said, "This was an important goal for me, and I hope I've still got goals left to help Real Madrid. It was an important win and a special night." Kaká came on just before an hour was played, but was sent off as he was controversially booked twice within 18 minutes in a 0–0 draw against Osasuna on 12 January 2013. It was his first sending-off at Madrid since he joined from Milan in 2009 and his first red card since he was dismissed playing for Brazil against Ivory Coast at the 2010 FIFA World Cup. Real Madrid finished the season in second place in La Liga behind Barcelona, and also finished runners-up in the Copa del Rey to city rivals Atlético Madrid. They were eliminated in the semi-finals of the Champions League for the third consecutive year by eventual runners-up Borussia Dortmund.

On 29 August 2013, Kaká expressed his desire to leave Real Madrid, having scored 29 goals and provided 32 assists in 120 appearances in all competitions over four seasons at the club. He said goodbye to Real Madrid and its fans in an open letter on Twitter.

Return to AC Milan
Milan confirmed that Kaká would join the club on 2 September 2013 from Real Madrid on a free transfer with only performance-related incentives owed to Madrid; after agreeing to personal terms, he signed a two-year contract. Kaká's contract was worth €4 million net per year and he was given the number 22 shirt, the same number he wore for Milan during his first spell. He was also made the vice-captain upon his arrival. He captained Milan in his debut for his second spell, taking the armband from goalkeeper Marco Amelia in a match against Chiasso.

Kaká tore his left adductor muscle during his first competitive appearance, deciding not to accept any wages from Milan whilst he regained fitness. He made his return for Milan on 19 October after coming on as a 76th-minute substitute in a 1–0 home victory against Udinese. In his next match, on 22 October, Kaká assisted Robinho in the 1–1 home draw against Barcelona in the Champions League. His first goal, described by ESPN as "a sensational curling shot from the edge of the area into the top right-hand corner," opened the scoring in a 1–1 home draw at San Siro to Lazio on 30 October. On 7 January 2014, Kaká scored his 100th goal for Milan by an opening goal in a match against Atalanta; he later went on to score another goal 30 minutes later. On 11 March he scored a goal against Atlético Madrid in Vicente Calderón Stadium, this goal made him the last player to score against Atlético Madrid at Vicente Calderón for three seasons in knockout phase until Isco scored against them in 2016–17 UEFA Champions League semi final. On 29 March 2014, Kaká scored twice in a 3–0 win against Chievo, his 300th match for Milan.

In June 2014, it was reported that Kaká had entered into advanced discussions with Orlando City to join the team in January 2015 when they enter Major League Soccer (MLS).
On 30 June 2014, Kaká had his Milan contract terminated through mutual consent despite having a year remaining, by activating a release clause as a result of the team not qualifying for European competitions.

Orlando City

Kaka joined future MLS franchise Orlando City as their first Designated Player. He stated that he had "always" wanted to play in the United States, and cited the Brazilian owner Flávio Augusto da Silva as a reason for signing. Until Orlando entered the league in 2015, Kaká was loaned to his first club São Paulo, which he called "really satisfying."

By signing for Orlando City, Kaká became the highest-paid player in MLS history, with a base salary of US$6.6 million per year, and with a guaranteed compensation of $7.2 million per year.

Loan to São Paulo
On 3 July 2014, Kaká arrived at São Paulo and began training the next day. He made his comeback in a league match against Goiás on 27 July 2014, starting and scoring a goal in the 76th minute, although his team lost 2–1. On 4 September 2014, in the second round of the Copa Sudamericana, Kaká scored in a 2–0 victory over Criciúma. On 9 November 2014, Kaká scored the winning goal in a 2–1 victory over Vitória.

Return to Orlando City 

Kaká scored in his first match for Orlando City, a 4–0 friendly win over FC Dallas. He then scored again in a 1–1 friendly draw against New York City FC. On 8 March 2015, Kaká scored a free kick for the equaliser in a 1–1 draw on his MLS debut against New York City FC at the Citrus Bowl, the first in Orlando City's competitive history. Kaká scored one and assisted another in a 2–2 draw with Montreal Impact on 28 March 2015. He came second in the Etihad Airways MLS Player of the Month poll for his performances in March.

On 13 April 2015, Kaká scored a penalty against Portland Timbers in a 2–0 win. On 17 May 2015, Kaká scored one and assisted another in Orlando City's 4–0 win over defending MLS champions LA Galaxy. By doing so, Orlando became the first expansion team to beat a defending MLS champion by more than a three-goal margin. On 30 June, Kaká scored Orlando's opening goal in the 21st minute of his Open Cup debut, helping his team to a 2–0 home win over Columbus Crew, in the fifth round of the competition, which enabled the club to advance to the quarter-finals. On 5 July, he received the first straight red card of his career in a 1–1 away draw against Real Salt Lake; he had previously scored a goal during the match. Later that month, Kaká was named to the 2015 MLS All-Star Game as the team's captain. During the MLS All-Star Game on 29 July, at the Dick's Sporting Goods Park in Commerce City, Colorado, he scored from a penalty and later assisted David Villa as the MLS All-Stars defeated Tottenham Hotspur 2–1; Kaká was named MVP of the match. Despite his efforts, he was unable to help Orlando City become the first expansion team to qualify for the MLS Cup Playoffs since the Seattle Sounders in 2009, as Orlando narrowly missed out on the sixth seed spot in the Eastern Conference; he ended his first season with 9 goals and 7 assists in 28 MLS appearances, also scoring another goal from two appearances in the 2015 MLS Open Cup.

After initially being sidelined through injury and missing Orlando City's first three matches of the 2016 MLS season, Kaká returned to the team's starting line-up and made his first appearance of the season on 3 April, against the Portland Timbers; he assisted two goals and later scored one himself in a 4–1 home victory, and was subsequently named to the MLS team of the week for his performance. In July 2016, he was included in the roster for the 2016 MLS All-Star Game. He finished his second MLS season with the club with 9 goals and 10 assists in 24 appearances, as Orlando once again failed to qualify for the MLS Cup Playoffs.

On 5 March 2017, in Orlando City's opening match of the MLS season against New York City, and the club's stadium debut, Kaká hit the turf clutching his left leg just minutes after the game had started; the Lions beat their opponents 1–0. Later, it was reported that Kaká would be out for 6 weeks due to a hamstring strain. Kaka came back in action and he scored on his return in Orlando City 2–0 win over Colorado Rapids on 29 April. The next week, he scored another goal in Orlando's 2–1 loss against Toronto FC. He scored his third goal of the season in a 2–2 draw against Sporting KC on 13 May 2017. On 14 June, he played in the 3–1 loss in U.S. Open Cup match against Miami FC which was coached by his former teammate Alessandro Nesta. On 17 June he assisted Matías Pérez García's goal against Montreal Impact. The following match, he provided another assist for Scott Sutter last minute equalizer against Seattle Sounders. On 7 July, he was chosen to play for the 2017 MLS All-Star Game for the third consecutive season. He scored a long range stunner against Atlanta United on 29 July.

Orlando City were officially eliminated from playoff contention on 7 October, following New York Red Bulls's 3–0 victory over Vancouver Whitecaps. Kaká announced on 11 October 2017 that he would not be renewing his contract with Orlando City for the 2018 MLS season. He played his last official match for Orlando on 15 October in a 1–0 home defeat against Columbus Crew; he finished the 2017 MLS season with 6 goals and 5 assists in 23 league appearances. He later appeared once more for Orlando, in a 6–1 home win over the Puerto Rican national team in the Fuerza Puerto Rico friendly, held on 5 November, to raise money for Hurricane Maria relief. In total, Kaká made 75 league appearances in his three seasons with Orlando, scoring 24 goals and providing 22 assists.

Retirement
Kaká announced his retirement on 17 December 2017, after turning down offers from his former clubs São Paulo and AC Milan. He also expressed interest in working as a director, confirming that Milan had offered him a role.

International career

Youth career and early senior career

Kaká was called up for the 2001 FIFA World Youth Championship, but the Brazilians crashed out to Ghana in the quarter-finals. Several months later, he made his debut for the senior Brazil squad in a friendly match against Bolivia on 31 January 2002. He was part of Brazil's 2002 FIFA World Cup-winning squad in Korea/Japan, but played only 25 minutes, all of which were in the 5–2 first round victory against Costa Rica on 13 June.

In 2003, Kaká was the captain for the 2003 CONCACAF Gold Cup, where Brazil, competing with their under-23 team, finished as runner-up to Mexico. He scored three goals during the tournament.

First Confederations Cup title and 2006 World Cup
Kakà was included in Brazil's squad for 2005 FIFA Confederations Cup in Germany. He appeared in all five matches and scored one goal in a 4–1 win over Argentina in the final.

Kaká started in his first FIFA World Cup finals in 2006 and scored his first and only goal of the tournament with a 25-yard strike in Brazil's 1–0 victory over Croatia in Brazil's opener, for which he was named Man of the Match. Kaká was unable to keep up the momentum for the remainder of the tournament, as Brazil was eliminated by France in the quarter-finals with French star Thierry Henry scoring the winner.

In a friendly against rivals Argentina at the Emirates Stadium, London on 3 September 2006, after entering as a substitute, Kaká received the ball off a deflection from an Argentina corner kick and outran Lionel Messi while taking the ball down three quarters of the field to score. Exhibiting his "fantastic acceleration and balletic grace" (according to Carl Anka for the BBC), Kaká regards it as the greatest goal he ever scored. On 12 May 2007, citing an exhaustive schedule of Serie A, Champions League and national team play, Kaká bowed out of the 2007 Copa América, which Brazil won. After missing out on the Copa América, he returned to play in Brazil's friendly match against Algeria on 22 August 2007. On 11 October 2008, Kaká opened the scoring for Brazil in their 4–0 win against Venezuela in a qualification game for the 2010 FIFA World Cup.

Second Confederations Cup title and 2010 World Cup
Kaká participated in the 2009 FIFA Confederations Cup, wearing the number 10 shirt, marking his first international tournament since the 2006 World Cup. His only two goals came in Brazil's group stage opener against Egypt on 14 June, when he scored a goal in the fifth minute and then added a 90th-minute penalty in Brazil's 4–3 victory. Kaká also provided two assists throughout the tournament. He received the Golden Ball as the player of the tournament at the Confederations Cup and was also named the Man of the Match in the final after helping Brazil to a 3–2 win against the United States.

At the 2010 World Cup in South Africa, during the match against Ivory Coast on 20 June, Kaká received a controversial red card after receiving two yellow cards. The second card was given for an alleged elbow in the direction of Abdul Kader Keïta. Kaká ended the tournament with three assists in total, as the joint-top assist provider, although he failed to score a goal during the tournament. Brazil eventually ended up losing 2–1 to World Cup eventual runners-up Netherlands in the quarter-finals of the tournament.

Later career
After more than a year absence from the national team due to a series of injuries, Kaká was recalled on 27 October 2011 for the friendly matches against Gabon and Egypt in November. He later had to be removed from the squad due to a calf injury, and thus did not play either of the matches.

After not appearing for Brazil in two years, Kaká was recalled on 28 September 2012 for the friendly matches against Iraq and Japan in October. Following his recall to the Seleção squad, Kaká stated, "I admit it was a surprise this call ... When the list was published, I was extremely happy. It was like my first call-up." Brazil coach Mano Menezes said that despite Kaká and Oscar's similarities, the two would be able to play alongside each other, as Kaká had slightly changed his playing style. On his return to the national side, Kaká scored in both matches, a 6–0 win over Iraq and a 4–0 win over Japan. Kaká retained his place in the squad for Brazil's 1,000th game in history, a 1–1 friendly draw against Colombia on 14 November 2012.

On 5 March 2013, Kaká was called up by new Brazil coach Luiz Felipe Scolari for the first time since the coach's return, for friendlies with Italy in London and Russia in Geneva, both taking place late in that month. Kaká, however, was not selected for the national team for the 2013 Confederations Cup and was also omitted from Scolari's 2014 World Cup squad. After almost 18 months, Kaká was recalled to the Brazilian team in October 2014 by new manager Dunga for friendlies against Argentina and Japan. On 1 May 2015, Kaká was selected as one of seven stand-by players in Brazil's preliminary squad for the 2015 Copa América, although he was not called up for the final tournament. In August 2015, he was called up to the national team once again for the team's international friendlies in September, and made a substitute appearance in Brazil's 1–0 victory over Costa Rica on 5 September; this was his first appearance for Brazil in almost a year, and his 90th appearance for his country overall. Following Douglas Costa's left thigh injury in late May 2016, which ruled him out of Brazil's Copa América Centenario squad, Kaká was called up as a replacement by Dunga. On 30 May, he subsequently appeared as an 80th-minute substitute in a pre-Copa América friendly warm-up match against Panama, which ended in a 2–0 victory to Brazil. A muscle injury sustained in early June, however, also ruled Kaká out of the upcoming tournament; he was replaced by Ganso.

Style of play and reception

Regarded as one of the best players of his generation, Kaká has been described on the FIFA website as having the "capacity to glide almost effortlessly past opponents, provide defence-splitting passes and score consistently from distance." During his prime at Milan in the mid to late 2000s, and prior to the injuries he suffered at Real Madrid which affected his mobility, Kaká was a quick, agile, hard-working, highly skilful and creative team player with great pace, ball control, technique, movement, and balance, capable of dribbling past defenders in one on one situations as well as during counterattacks. Regarding his speed and elegance on the ball during his trademark forward runs, in 2017, Karl Matchett of Bleacher Report stated:

Tim Vickery of ESPN wrote, "Kaká running forward with the ball had the power of a freight train. He married power with finesse", but on the impact of his knee and groin issues at Madrid, added, "once his acceleration had been reduced, he lacked the subtlety to shine as before." Carl Anka of the BBC writes that his "knee and groin problems sapped him of the explosive half-yard burst he needed to navigate the corridors of midfield uncertainty", and that by 2009 he "was already on the wane." Anka adds that being the last player to win FIFA World Player of the Year (in 2007) prior to the Messi-Ronaldo dominance over the next decade, Kaká's standing in the game has been "lost in a haze", with his "greatness just out of sight".

Ronaldinho states, "For two, maybe three seasons [at Milan] he was the best player in the world. There was nothing he couldn’t do”, while his Milan teammate Andrea Pirlo adds, "There was a point when teams just had no idea how to stop him." As well as his dribbling from midfield, Kaká was also renowned for his vision and passing ability, enabling him to create chances for teammates. Having performed predominantly as a playmaking attacking midfielder throughout his career, he was known for being capable of scoring goals as well as creating and assisting them. A versatile player, he was also deployed in several other attacking positions throughout his career, performing as a winger on either flank, as a supporting forward, and on occasion as an outright striker, or even in a deeper role as a midfield playmaker. In addition to these characteristics, Kaká also possessed a powerful and accurate shot from both inside and outside the penalty area, with either foot, despite being naturally right-footed; he preferred to strike the ball with finesse rather than power, however, and had a penchant for scoring from distance with bending shots. He was also an accurate penalty taker. In 2020, 90min.com placed Kakà at number 42 in their list of "The 50 Greatest Footballers of All Time."

Personal life

Kaká married his childhood sweetheart Caroline Celico on 23 December 2005 at a Rebirth in Christ church in São Paulo. The couple have two children: son Luca Celico Leite (born 10 June 2008) and daughter Isabella (born 23 April 2011). In 2015, Kaká and Celico announced their divorce via social media.

Kaká was sworn in as an Italian citizen on 12 February 2007. He features prominently in Adidas advertising and also has a modeling contract with Armani, the latter preventing him from appearing in a photo collection alongside his Milan teammates that was published by Dolce & Gabbana in early 2007.

Kaká appeared on the cover of the Italian edition of EA Sports' FIFA video game FIFA 07, alongside compatriot and global coverstar Ronaldinho; he was also featured on the cover of some regional editions of FIFA 11, FIFA 12, and FIFA 16. He featured in FIFA 20 as one of the new Ultimate Team Icons.

Kaká cites Raí, the former Brazilian national team and São Paulo FC captain, as his footballing role model. He is best friends with Marcelo Saragosa, who also played professionally. They each served as the best man at the other's wedding. He is also close friends with Colombia striker Radamel Falcao.

In April 2012, Kaká became the first sportsperson to amass ten million followers on Twitter, and by March 2015, Kaká had the fifth-highest social media rank in the world among athletes, behind Cristiano Ronaldo, Lionel Messi, David Beckham and Neymar, with 33 million Facebook fans.

Kaká is a devout evangelical Christian who was an active member of the São Paulo-based Rebirth in Christ Church. He became engrossed in religion at the age of 12: "I learnt that it is faith that decides whether something will happen or not." He removed his jersey to reveal an "I Belong to Jesus" T-shirt and openly engaged in prayer moments after the final whistle of Brazil's 2002 World Cup, as well as Milan's 2004 Scudetto and 2007 Champions League triumphs. He also had the same phrase, along with "God Is Faithful," stitched onto the tongues of his boots. During the post-match celebration following Brazil's 4–1 win over Argentina in the 2005 Confederations Cup final, he and several of his teammates wore T-shirts that read "Jesus Loves You" in various languages. While receiving the FIFA World Footballer of the Year award in 2007, he said when he was young he just wanted to be a professional player for São Paulo and play one game for the Brazil national team, but that "God gave [him] more than he ever asked for." Though sharing a common goal with Atletas de Cristo ("Athletes of Christ"), Kaká is not currently a formal member of the organization. In goal celebrations, he usually points to the sky as a gesture of thanks to God. Kaká's favourite music genre is gospel, and his favourite book is the Bible. In a 2006 interview with the Brazilian newspaper O Globo, Kaka announced that he wanted to become an evangelical pastor.

Since November 2004, Kaká has served as an Ambassador Against Hunger for the United Nations' World Food Programme, the youngest to do so at the time of his appointment. In August 2015, Kaká announced he would attend Full Sail University in Winter Park, Florida, and major in Sports Marketing. On 5 January 2019, he announced his engagement to Brazilian model Carolina Dias on Instagram. Kaká was one of several Brazilian international footballers to endorse Jair Bolsonaro in the 2018 Brazilian presidential election.

Career statistics

Club

International

Scores and results list Brazil's goal tally first, score column indicates score after each Kaká goal.

Honours
São Paulo
Supercampeonato Paulista: 2002
Torneio Rio – São Paulo: 2001

AC Milan
Serie A: 2003–04
Supercoppa Italiana: 2004
UEFA Champions League: 2006–07
UEFA Super Cup: 2007
FIFA Club World Cup: 2007

Real Madrid
La Liga: 2011–12
Copa del Rey: 2010–11

Brazil
FIFA World Cup: 2002
FIFA Confederations Cup: 2005, 2009

Individual
Ballon d'Or: 2007
FIFA World Player of the Year: 2007
FIFPro World Player of the Year: 2007
FIFPro World XI: 2006, 2007, 2008
UEFA Team of the Year: 2006, 2007, 2009
UEFA.com Team of the Year: 2006, 2007, 2009
UEFA Club Forward of the Year: 2006–07
UEFA Club Footballer of the Year: 2006–07
UEFA Club Midfielder of the Year: 2004–05
UEFA Champions League Bronze Foot: 2005–06
Pallone d'Argento: 2006–07
World Soccer Player of the Year: 2007
Serie A Foreign Footballer of the Year: 2004, 2006, 2007
Serie A Footballer of the Year: 2004, 2007
Bola de Ouro: 2002
Bola de Prata: 2002
South American Team of the Year: 2002
CONCACAF Gold Cup Best XI: 2003
IFFHS World's Best Playmaker: 2007
IAAF Latin Sportsman of the Year: 2007
Onze d'Or: 2007
FIFA Club World Cup Golden Ball: 2007
Time 100: 2008, 2009
Maracanã Hall of Fame: 2008
Samba Gold: 2008
MARCA Legend Award: 2009
FIFA Confederations Cup Golden Ball: 2009
FIFA Confederations Cup Best XI: 2009
AC Milan Hall of Fame: 2010
MLS All-Star: 2015, 2016, 2017
MLS All-Star Game MVP: 2015
UEFA Ultimate Team of the Year: 2015 (substitute)

References

External links

 
 
 
 
 
 

1982 births
Living people
Sportspeople from Federal District (Brazil)
Brazilian evangelicals
Brazilian footballers
Association football midfielders
Campeonato Brasileiro Série A players
São Paulo FC players
Serie A players
A.C. Milan players
La Liga players
Real Madrid CF players
Orlando City SC players
Major League Soccer players
Major League Soccer All-Stars
Designated Players (MLS)
UEFA Champions League winning players
UEFA Champions League top scorers
Brazil youth international footballers
Brazil under-20 international footballers
Brazil international footballers
2002 FIFA World Cup players
2003 CONCACAF Gold Cup players
2005 FIFA Confederations Cup players
2006 FIFA World Cup players
2009 FIFA Confederations Cup players
2010 FIFA World Cup players
FIFA Confederations Cup-winning players
FIFA World Cup-winning players
FIFA World Player of the Year winners
UEFA Men's Player of the Year Award winners
World Soccer Magazine World Player of the Year winners
Ballon d'Or winners
Brazilian expatriate footballers
Expatriate footballers in Italy
Expatriate footballers in Spain
Expatriate soccer players in the United States
Brazilian expatriate sportspeople in the United States
Brazilian emigrants to Italy
Naturalised citizens of Italy
Ambassadors of supra-national bodies
Full Sail University alumni
World Food Programme people
Italian people of Brazilian descent